Probable G-protein coupled receptor 115 is a protein that in humans is encoded by the GPR115 gene.

References

Further reading

G protein-coupled receptors